Nashipur Rail Bridge or Nashipur – Azimganj Rail Bridge will connect Murshidabad railway station and Azimganj Junction railway station across the river Bhagirathi of district Murshidabad in West Bengal. 
The 785 meters long bridge existed during British regime and was later disbanded during World War II. Azimganj - Nalhati Railway line started in the year 1872. The bridge used to act as a NG branch line from Azimganj to Behrampore connecting Lalgola Krishnnagar NG line with Azimganj Nalhati BG line.

This rail bridge on the Bhagirathi river will reduce travel time between South Bengal and North Bengal.
As per railway officials the bridge would reduce the distance between Sealdah and New Jalpaiguri by about 21 km. 
Trains like Teesta - Torsha Express (Sealdah to Jalpaiguri) and Radhikapur Express (Kolkata railway station to Radhikapur) will benefit when the route starts.
The new bridge is 758 meters long and designed for 160 kmph running speed of trains. Due to difficulties of land acquisition this project halted for 12 years since 2010 (90% construction was completed at that time ) .After 12 years, the dispute of the land of 476 metre has resolved and again construction started on 30th November,2022 . Railway promised to complete the leftover construction before on April,2023 . Darjeeling Mail (sealdah -new jalpaiguri) has been already planned to reroute through this new and historic railway line .

Land acquisition problem
More the 90% of the work has been completed but due to land acquisition problem the work is stopped.

Due to the ongoing land acquisition problem for this track the Rs. 70 crore for this project of Indian Railways stands abandoned. The plots that need to be acquired are located between Azimganj railway junction and the right bank of the Bhagirathi in Mahinagar area of Murshidabad - Jiaganj block.
 
Rail Roko agitations has been organised since 1994 by Murshidabad District Railway Passengers Association over this long standing demand.

As per "Anandabazar patrika" dated 9 October 2015, land Acquisition problem has been resolved & land has been submitted to the railway division to start work for approach line

As per 24 Ghanta  news dated 16 March 2017 the work is going on with schedule speed & lying of track & electrification will be completed by year end.

Eastern railway is planning to introduce some trains in this route and proposal has been sent to railway board for "Darjeeling mail" also to divert through this route. As per railway board they are analysing the proposal but not yet decided. 

According to "Ei Samay" and "Anandabazar Patrika", work has begun on the west approach to the bridge on 30 November 2022.

See also
Jiaganj Azimganj

References

Railway bridges in India
Rail transport in West Bengal
Bridges in West Bengal
Buildings and structures in Murshidabad district
Railway bridges in West Bengal